Maiden Gully is a suburb of the regional city of Bendigo in central Victoria, Australia, located  west of the central business district along Calder Highway. At the 2016 census, Maiden Gully had a population of 4,992.

Maiden Gully is surrounded by the Bendigo suburbs of Kangaroo Flat, Eaglehawk, California Gully, Long Gully, West Bendigo, Golden Square and the outer-rural suburbs of Lockwood, Marong and Myers Flat.

Maiden Gully has experienced enormous growth in recent years, with growth mainly centred to the north of the Calder Highway in the Robin Hill Estate, and to the Southwest of the Calder Highway. In addition to this, there remains a small pocket of semi-rural acreages to the west of Monsants Road. Maiden Gully is very popular suburb of Greater Bendigo with families due to its rural feel, with easy access to the Bendigo CBD, an easy 10-minute drive away. 

The suburb has developed and changed immensely since the early 1990s. From the early to mid 1990s a general store operated with Fuel, Video/DVD hire and a takeaway store. Fuel at the store ceased to be available in the early 2000's. The Avondel Caravan Park is situated alongside the store.

Maiden Gully's local amenities include the Maiden Gully Primary School, Post Office, Maiden Gully Cafe (previously the General Store), Bendigo UFS Pharmacy, Local Bakery as well as an IGA Supermarket that opened in 2006. As of 2022, a Medical Clinic and a Childcare Centre were also operating. In 2015 Marist college Bendigo opened and now has over 1000 students. The school is a branch of the Marist brothers and is seen as one of the reasons for the big growth in the area.

References

Suburbs of Bendigo
Bendigo